Heather MacLean or Heather Maclean can refer to:

Heather Maclean (author) (born 1972), American author
Heather MacLean (swimmer) (born 1992), Canadian swimmer who participated in the 2012 Summer Olympics
Heather MacLean (runner) (born 1995), American middle distance runner

See also
Heather McLean (born 1993), Canadian speed skater